Roy Patrick (4 December 1935 – 1998) was a professional footballer who played for Derby County, Nottingham Forest, Southampton, Exeter City and Burton Albion.

1935 births
1998 deaths
Footballers from Derbyshire
English footballers
Association football central defenders
English Football League players
Derby County F.C. players
Nottingham Forest F.C. players
Southampton F.C. players
Exeter City F.C. players
Burton Albion F.C. players